The Letov Š-19 was an airliner produced in small numbers in Czechoslovakia during the 1920s.

Design and development
Following tests with an Š-6 bomber over domestic passenger routes, ČSA requested that a passenger-carrying version be developed. While retaining the basic layout of the Š-6, the Š-19 added a fully enclosed passenger cabin within the fuselage, with seating for four. The pilot had an open cockpit behind the cabin.

Three machines were built with the same Maybach engine that had powered the bomber version, but these were found to have poor flying characteristics, and for the other four examples produced, a Walter powerplant was used instead, along with making some refinements to the ailerons and wing bracing.

Put into service on the Prague-Košice route, the type was not a success. The passenger cabin was very noisy, since it was placed immediately behind the engine. Furthermore, this placement made boarding and disembarking awkward, and visibility for the passengers was poor. Besides this, the Š-19 could not match the performance offered by foreign aircraft, and no further production was undertaken.

Specifications

See also

References

 
 

Letov aircraft
1920s Czechoslovakian airliners
Biplanes
Single-engined tractor aircraft
Aircraft first flown in 1924